Mary Harris may refer to:

Mary Styles Harris (born 1949), geneticist
Mary Harris Jones (1837–1930), community organiser
Mary Harris Memorial Chapel of the Holy Trinity
Mel Harris (Mary Ellen Harris, born 1956), actress
Mary Lee Cagle (1864–1955), married name Mary Harris, pastor
Mary Harris (musician), member of the music group Ambrosia
Mary Packer Harris (1891–1978), Scottish artist and art teacher
Mary Harris (cricketer), New Zealand cricketer
Mary Johnson Harris (born 1963), member of the Louisiana Board of Elementary and Secondary Education 
Mary Harris (public servant), clerk of the New Zealand House of Representatives
Mary Harris (murderer), American murderer

See also
Harris (surname)